Ngombe Mbengue (born April  6, 1993) is a professional Cameroonian footballer who plays as a forward for the Iraqi Premier League club Naft Al-Basra.

Career
Mbengue started playing with Botafogo and then moved to New Star de Douala. in August 2016 he signed a four-year contract with OC Khourigba, where he played professionally in Morocco. In January 2018, he moved to Kawkab Marrakech, and in June 2018 he moved to the Kuwait Premier League, where he signed a contract with Al-Jahra. In January 2021, Mbengue moved to the Oman Professional League, signing with Al-Suwaiq.

In September 2021, Mbengue moved to play in the Iraqi Premier League, where he signed a one-year contract with Naft Al-Basra, and in August 2022 his contract was renewed for an additional year.

References

External links

1993 births
Living people
Cameroonian footballers
Cameroonian expatriate footballers
Association football forwards
New Star de Douala players
Suwaiq Club players
Naft Al-Basra SC players
Expatriate footballers in Morocco
Expatriate footballers in Kuwait
Expatriate footballers in Oman
Expatriate footballers in Iraq
Cameroonian expatriates in Morocco
Cameroonian expatriates in Kuwait
Cameroonian expatriates in Oman
Cameroonian expatriates in Iraq
Cameroonian expatriate sportspeople in Iraq
Botola players
Oman Professional League players